Belafonte Returns to Carnegie Hall is a live double album by Harry Belafonte. It is the second of two Belafonte Carnegie Hall albums, and was recorded May 2, 1960. It peaked at #3 on the Billboard Pop albums charts.

Belafonte shares the stage in this live recording with The Belafonte Folk Singers, Odetta, The Chad Mitchell Trio and Miriam Makeba.

Track listing
"Jump Down Spin Around" - Harry Belafonte and the Belafonte Folk Singers - 2:14
"Suzanne" - Harry Belafonte - 5:50
"A Little Lyric of Great Importance" - Harry Belafonte and the Belafonte Folk Singers - 1:29
"Chickens" - Harry Belafonte and the Belafonte Folk Singers - 3:10
"Vaichazkem" - The Chad Mitchell Trio - 1:34
"I Do Adore Her" - The Chad Mitchell Trio - 3:18
"The Ballad of Sigmund Freud" - The Chad Mitchell Trio - 3:28
"I've Been Driving On Bald Mountain/Water Boy" - Odetta - 6:54
"A Hole in the Bucket" - Harry Belafonte and Odetta - 5:19
"The Click Song" - Miriam Makeba and The Belafonte Folk Singers - 3:46
"One More Dance" - Harry Belafonte and Miriam Makeba - 3:43
"The Ox Drivers" - Belafonte Folk Singers - 2:59
"The Red Rosy Bush" - Belafonte Folk Singers - 2:51
"Didn't It Rain" - Belafonte Folk Singers - 5:27
"Hene Ma Tov" - Harry Belafonte and the Belafonte Folk Singers - 3:46
"I Know Where I'm Going" - Harry Belafonte and the Belafonte Folk Singers - 3:27
"Old King Cole" - Harry Belafonte and the Belafonte Folk Singers - 4:59
"La Bamba" - Harry Belafonte and the Belafonte Folk Singers - 8:04

The RCA Victor  compact disc reissue (09026-62690-2) of this album contains alternate performances of the songs "Jump Down, Spin Around", "Hené Ma Tov", "I Know Where I'm Going" and "La Bamba".

Personnel
Harry Belafonte – vocals
The Belafonte Folk Singers – vocals
Chad Mitchell Trio – vocals
Odetta – vocals
Miriam Makeba – vocals
Danny Barrajanos – bongos, conga
Ernie Calabria – guitar
Walter Raim – guitar
Millard Thomas – guitar
Robert De Cormier – conductor
Milton Okun – conductor

Production notes
Bob Bollard – producer, liner notes
John Pfeiffer – reissue producer
Bob Simpson – engineer
Digital Remastering by Nate Johnson and Thomas MacCluskey	
Photography by Roy DeCarava, Peter Perri and Jay Maisel

1960 live albums
Albums recorded at Carnegie Hall
Harry Belafonte live albums
RCA Victor live albums
Albums conducted by Milt Okun
Albums conducted by Robert De Cormier